Evolution is the first of two albums released in 1967 by British pop rock band the Hollies. It is their sixth UK album and peaked at number 13 on the UK Albums Chart.

Background
Like its predecessor, For Certain Because, this album comprises only songs written by group members Allan Clarke, Graham Nash, and Tony Hicks. None of the songs on the album were selected for single or EP release in the UK, although "Carrie Anne" from the American release was issued as a single in the US. Drummer Bobby Elliott only played on three songs on the album due to appendicitis and, as a result, he was substituted for by Dougie Wright, Clem Cattini and Mitch Mitchell of the Jimi Hendrix Experience.

The album cover artwork was created by the Fool, with the psychedelic cover photo by Karl Ferris, who is credited with creating the first truly psychedelic photograph for an album cover.

Ferris commented on the making of the album cover during a special signing of cover prints in 1997:

In 1978, Parlophone reissued the stereo version of Evolution, along with Butterfly and Confessions of the Mind.

The song "Have You Ever Loved Somebody?" was released earlier (in September 1966) both by the Searchers and Paul and Barry Ryan as single a-sides. It was first released by the Everly Brothers on their Two Yanks in England album.

Recording
Evolution and its respective singles were recorded at EMI's Abbey Road Studios in just six days spread over three months in early 1967, at the same time the Beatles were recording Sgt. Pepper's Lonely Hearts Club Band. The first session occurred on 11 January where "When Your Lights Turned On", "Have You Ever Loved Somebody" and the B-side "All the World is Love" were completed. Work began on, but was not completed for, the eventual single "On a Carousel". That song was completed during the next session on 13 January along with the album track, "Lullaby to Tim". Two songs sung in Italian, "Non Prego Per Me" and "Devi Avere Fiducia in Me" (the former composed by Lucio Battisti and Mogol), were also recorded on that day specifically for release as a single in Italy. The next session on 22 February was dedicated to two more songs meant specifically for release in Italy, "We're Alive" and "Kill Me Quick". "The Games We Play" as well as the Graham Gouldman-penned "Schoolgirl" were also begun during this session. The bulk of album work took place on March 3, 8 and 17. "Schoolgirl" was attempted again on the 8th but was ultimately left unfinished for reasons unknown. It was completed years later, in November 1997, by Tony Hicks (who also recorded additional guitar) and his son Paul at Abbey Road studios and released on the "Abbey Road 66-70" CD. The final songs recorded before the album's release in June were "Carrie Anne" on 1 May and its B-side, "Signs That Will Never Change", on the following day.

Track listing
All tracks written by Allan Clarke, Tony Hicks, and Graham Nash.

US version

Evolution was also the name of the Hollies' debut album for their new US label, Epic Records. But, like many American issues of British albums, this album was remixed using heavy echo and reverb. In addition, three songs were left off the album (with only "Carrie Anne" added).

The cover shown is the US/Canadian cover, which used the same Karl Ferris photograph but differed from the UK cover by dispensing with The Fool's overall cover design. Instead, the US/Canadian cover put the Hollies' name on the cover in more conventional psychedelic-influenced lettering, placed the album title on the cover in a normal font, and then overlaid a paisley-patterned image.

The 1998 US CD reissue of Evolution by Sundazed presents the original US Epic Evolution LP using the original EMI stereo masters. In addition, two of the songs that appeared on the UK Evolution, "Water on the Brain" and "When Your Lights Turn On" appear here as well as "Jennifer Eccles," "Signs That Will Never Change", and "Open Up Your Eyes."

Track listing

Personnel
The Hollies
Allan Clarke – vocals, harmonica
Tony Hicks – lead guitar, vocals
Graham Nash – rhythm guitar, vocals
Bobby Elliott – drums on "When Your Light's Turned On", "Have You Ever Loved Somebody?" and "Lullaby to Tim"
Bernie Calvert – bass guitar, harpsichord on "Ye Olde Toffee Shoppe"

Additional personnel
Ron Richards – production
Dougie Wright, Mitch Mitchell, Clem Cattini – drums except where noted
Elton John – piano on "Water on the Brain" and Hammond organ on "You Need Love"

Charts

References

1967 albums
The Hollies albums
Albums produced by Ron Richards (producer)
Parlophone albums
Epic Records albums